DMCH may refer to:
 Darbhanga Medical College and Hospital
 Dhaka Medical College and Hospital